Mihkel Lepper (also Mihhail Lepper; 13 March 1900 Warsaw – 2 May 1980 Stockholm) was an Estonian actor.

Before 1940 he worked at the film studio Estonia-Film in Tallinn.

Filmography
 1924 "Mineviku varjud" (feature film; role: Konrad von Eulenberg, commander)
 1925 "Tšeka komissar Miroštšenko" (feature film; role: Miroštšenko, Soviet Russia comissar)
 1928 "Herkules Maier" (German silent film, Reinhold Schünzel Film; role ?)
 1929 "Dollarid" ('Dollars') (comedy film; director)
 1929 "Jüri Rumm" (feature film; role: gendarme officer, baron's relative)

References

1900 births
1980 deaths
Estonian male film actors
Estonian male silent film actors
20th-century Estonian male actors
Estonian film directors
Estonian World War II refugees
Estonian emigrants to Germany
Estonian emigrants to Sweden
Male actors from Warsaw
People from Warsaw Governorate